Stomiidae is a family of deep-sea ray-finned fish, including the barbeled dragonfishes. They are quite small, usually around 15 cm, up to 26 cm. These fish are apex predators and have enormous jaws filled with fang-like teeth. They are also able to hinge the neurocranium and upper-jaw system, which leads to the opening of the jaw to more than 100 degrees. This ability allows them to consume extremely large prey, often 50% greater than their standard length.

Features 
It is one of the many species of deep-sea fish that can produce their own light through a chemical process known as bioluminescence. A special organ known as a photophore helps produce this light. The deep-sea dragonfishes have large heads, and mouths equipped with many sharp fang-like teeth. They have a long stringlike structure known as barbel, with a light-producing photophore at the tip, attached to their chin. They also have photophores attached along the sides of their body. A specific species of Stomiidae, the Chauliodus, cannot luminescence longer than 30 minutes without adrenaline. However, in presence of adrenaline, it can produce light for many hours. They produce blue-green light, the wavelengths of which can travel the farthest in the ocean. The deep-sea dragonfish waves its barbel back and forth and produces flashing lights on and off to attract prey and potential mates. Many of the species they prey upon also produce light themselves, which is why they have evolved to have black stomach walls to keep the lights concealed while digesting their meal in order to stay hidden from their predators.

Representative species gallery

References

External links 
 
 
 Review of the Astronesthid Fishes
 Malacosteus niger 
 The Deep Sea ocean biology
 Science and the Sea, Dragonfish
 Seasky, dragonfish

 
Ray-finned fish families